On the Money is the name of several finance- and business-focused television series:

On the Money (2005 TV program), an American daily personal finance television program airing from 2005–2009 on CNBC
On the Money (2013 TV program), formerly The Wall Street Journal Report, an American weekly business television program airing from 2013–2019 on CNBC and in broadcast syndication
On the Money (Canadian TV program), a Canadian daily finance and business television program airing from 2016–2018 on CBC News Network
On the Money (Philippine TV program), a Filipino daily business finance television program airing from July 30, 2012 on ANC